USS Kittiwake (ASR-13) was a United States Navy  in commission from 1946 to 1994.

Construction and commissioning

Kittiwake was launched 10 July 1945, by Savannah Machine & Foundry Co., Savannah, Georgia; sponsored by Mrs. Howard S. Rue, Jr.; and commissioned 18 July 1946.

Service history
After shakedown, Kittiwake departed Charleston, South Carolina, 3 October for Balboa, Canal Zone, arriving 8 October. Assigned to support and rescue duty with Submarine Squadron 6, the submarine rescue ship accompanied submarines during sea trials and maneuvers to monitor diving operations, practice underwater rescue procedures, and recover practice torpedoes. While based at Balboa, her operations carried her to the Virgin Islands, to Puerto Rico, and along the Atlantic coast to the Davis Strait.

Departing Balboa 31 May 1949, Kittiwake arrived at Norfolk, Virginia, 6 June to continue duty with SUBRON 6. From 17 January to 1 February 1950, she provided divers and equipment during salvage operations to free the battleship , grounded in tidal banks off Thimble Shoals, Virginia. During the 1950s, she cruised the Atlantic from New England to the Caribbean while supporting ships of Submarine Force U.S. Atlantic Fleet. While on station off the coast of Cape Canaveral, Florida, 20 July 1960, she stood ready to assist the fleet ballistic missile submarine  as George Washington successfully launched the first two Polaris ballistic missiles ever fired from a submerged submarine.

Kittiwake continued operating from Norfolk until 1 August 1961, when she departed for the Mediterranean. Arriving at Rota, Spain, on 15 August, she cruised the Mediterranean from Spain to Greece while deployed with the United States Sixth Fleet. After supporting submarine maneuvers from Piraeus, Greece, from 20 September to 9 October, she departed the Mediterranean on 8 November and arrived in Norfolk on 18 November. She then conducted operations from Norfolk for the next 18 months. While on duty off Key West 2 February 1963, she sighted a Cuban boat, Jose Maria Perez and took on board 12 refugees (including three children) fleeing Cuba; they were carried to safety at Key West.

Departing Charleston, South Carolina, 16 April, Kittiwake arrived at St. Nazaire, France, 3 May with two Landing Craft Utility (LCU's) in tow. She proceeded to the Mediterranean on 10 May and reached Rota on the 14th. She participated in fleet operations for more than two months before departing Rota 31 July for the United States. Returning to Norfolk on 10 August 1963, she resumed training and support operations with submarines along the Atlantic coast. Through 1964 and 1965, Kittiwake continued her role in maintaining the readiness of individual submarines, which were to carry out their defense and deterrence missions effectively. She escorted them as they left the United States East Coast shipyards for sea trials, standing ready to come to their rescue should difficulties arise. Constant exercise in using weapons by submarines was furnished by Kittiwake, such as running as a target and recovering exercise torpedoes and mines. The operations ranged from the Virginia Capes to the Atlantic missile range off Florida. On 6 April 1965, she departed Norfolk with submarines for exercises off the coast of Spain, thence to the Mediterranean Sea.

Following torpedo recovery and training off the coast of Spain, she sailed for Holy Loch, Scotland 30 June 1965, to give support to Submarine Squadron 14 there.

Kittiwake operated on the U.S. East Coast and in the Caribbean until sailing for the Mediterranean 8 July 1966. She reached the Bay of Cádiz on the 20th and transited the straits two days later. She operated in the Mediterranean until emerging at Rota, Spain, 1 September. She headed for Holy Loch on the 6th and arrived on the 11th. Four days later she was ordered to the North Sea to assist in locating and salvaging the German submarine Hai (S-171). She reached the scene of the tragedy on 17 September and remained on hand assisting salvage operations until the 20th. She continued to operate off Western Europe until returning to Norfolk on 13 November. Kittiwake operated on the U.S. East Coast into 1967.

In May 1968, USS Kittiwake was sent to the mid-Atlantic as part of the fleet searching for the missing attack submarine . Kittiwake was assigned to the search until August 1968. 

On 23 April 1984, Kittiwake collided with the attack submarine  at Norfolk, Virginia, while Bergall was moored to the pier astern of her. Kittiwake was getting underway for the first time since she had undergone maintenance, during which her main drive motor was re-wired improperly, causing it and the screw it drove to rotate in the opposite direction from that ordered by personnel on Kittiwakes bridge. This was unknown to Kittiwakes bridge personnel, who found that Kittiwake started to move astern when they were expecting her to move forward. Noting the backward motion, they ordered an increase in the motor drive speed to correct it and get Kittiwake moving forward. However, they unwittingly caused Kittiwake to move farther astern and at a higher speed. Still not realizing that Kittiwakes main drive motor was operating in reverse of what they expected, Kittiwakes bridge personnel then ordered another increase in Kittiwakes forward speed, which served only to increase her speed astern. This continued until Kittiwakes stern backed into Bergalls sonar dome, causing damage to the Bergall's sonar dome and the USS Kittiwake's propeller.

In 1986, the Kittiwake recovered the black box from the Space Shuttle Challenger disaster.

On 5 December 1989, the USS Kittiwake provided surface support during a Navy Trident missile test in the Atlantic Ocean. Greenpeace had found out about the testing and had sent ships to protest this exercise. Greenpeace attacked the USS Kittiwake by hitting her aft port side with the bow of the Greenpeace ship. The USS Kittiwake returned the aggression by ramming the Greenpeace ship and disabling the engines by shooting water down the engine stack of the Greenpeace ship, making her dead in the water.

Decommissioning and disposal
Kittiwake was decommissioned on 30 September 1994 and struck from the Naval Vessel Register on the same day. Her title was transferred in November 2008 for an undisclosed amount to the government of the Cayman Islands for the purpose of using Kittiwake to form a new artificial reef. Originally intended to be sunk in June 2009, she was finally sunk off Seven Mile Beach, Grand Cayman, on 5 January 2011 in Marine Park

A 2011 episode of the documentary television series Monster Moves covered moving and sinking the ship. Divers are not allowed to touch or take anything from the dive site.

In October 2017, the wreck moved towards a nearby natural reef. It fell to its port side due to wave action from passing Tropical Storm Nate. The wreck is now approximately 20 feet deeper at its most shallow.

Awards
 World War II Victory Medal
 National Defense Service Medal with two stars

References

External links
Video "Exploring the Wreck of the U.S.S. Kittiwake" on YouTube

Chanticleer-class submarine rescue ships
Cold War auxiliary ships of the United States
Ships built in Savannah, Georgia
Maritime incidents in 1984
Maritime incidents in 2011
Ships sunk as artificial reefs
1945 ships